Pullard is a surname. Notable people with the surname include:

Anthony Pullard (born 1966), American basketball player who also played in Mexico
Hayes Pullard (born 1992), American football player and coach

See also
Bullard
Pullar